Melek Amet (4 October 1960 - 22 May 2008) was one of the best rated models of the eighties in Communist Romania. She was the first Crimean Tatar fashion model in Romania, she broke down many barriers and became the symbol of a cultural shift.

Biography 
Melek, which in Crimean Tatar language means Angel, was the daughter of Ğemal Seyidğan (also spelled in Romanian as: Gemal Seidgean) and Ğewerkan (also spelled in Romanian as: Gevercan). Her father Ğemal was from Medgidia and he had been a prosperous trader who invested his profit in land becoming a well-known landlord in Constanta, but the communists confiscated his properties and sentenced him to hard labor in the forced labor camps at the Danube-Black Sea Channel. When he was released, he fell in love with a beautiful schoolteacher. Her name was Ğewerkan, she was from Alakapî/Poarta Albă and she was twenty years younger than him. They married and, hoping to escape the harassment of the Muslims practiced by authorities in Dobruja, they moved to Bucharest where, on 4 October 1960, Melek, their only child, was born.

Melek had two short marriages. The first, when she was 18, with Mircea Trofin, the son of Virgil Trofin who was Deputy Prime Minister under Ceausescu, and the second with her schoolmate Sergiu Mocanu, politician, former director of the Democratic Party. Mircea Trofin was the one who approached her to sign for Venus Fashion House in Bucharest where, under the direction of Zina Dumitrescu, her career took off.

Melek embodied the perfect elegance and she became one of the most appreciated models prior to 1989. She went on to major Romanian magazines, particularly to Modern magazine. Along with Ilinca Vlad, Eugenia Enciu, Rodica Protasievici, Romanita Iovan, Janine and Catalin Botezatu, she has been part of the golden modeling generation in Romania. She toured with Stela Popescu, Alexandru Arsinel and Romica Puceanu. She presented exclusive collections to the Central Committee of the Romanian Communist Party, diplomatic corps and embassies and she was famous for her high-profile relationships. She was very hard working and always ready to help. 
She was stylish and she liked very much hats. Many believe that she was the most popular model in the communist era.

After a successful decade run between 1981 and 1992, she worked in international transports, she sold soft drinks, cars, chocolate and dresses. However, she never retired from modeling founding the Blu Models Agency. She also pursued a career as TV show host .
 
In 2006 Melek was diagnosed with ovarian cancer and she went through surgery. In 2008 the disease recurred and she eventually lost the fight.

Melek died on 22 May 2008 and she is resting at Ghencea Muslim Cemetery in Bucharest.

Legacy 

Melek cherished the brightness of life more than anyone. She knew how to smile to hostile destiny. Her last wish was to regain possession of her father's wealth and to build an oncology clinic to save lives. Although the court ruled in her favor granting possession of her father's properties, local authorities continue to refuse legal execution.

See also 
 Crimean Tatars
 List of Crimean Tatars

Citations

Sources 

 
 
 
 
 
 
 
 

1960 births
2008 deaths
Models from Bucharest
Romanian people of Crimean Tatar descent
Crimean Tatar models
Romanian Muslims